Blackie Wangerin (born April 4, 1935) is a former NASCAR Winston Cup driver from Bloomington, Minnesota. In 1971 he attempted to qualify for the Daytona 500 but did not make it past the qualifying race. He returned to the series in 1977 and made at least one start every season thereafter until 1984. In 1978 he made 10 starts with a best finish of 15th at Pocono Raceway and finished 37th in points. The following year he made 7 starts with another best finish of 15th, this time at Charlotte Motor Speedway, and despite making three fewer starts, finished two places better in 35th. Wangerin never drove in more than 3 races in a season after that and made his final Cup start in the 1984 Warner W. Hodgdon Carolina 500 at Rockingham.

His son Troy Wangerin is also a stock car driver who as of 2009 participated part-time in the ARCA RE/MAX series.

Motorsports career results

NASCAR
(key) (Bold – Pole position awarded by qualifying time. Italics – Pole position earned by points standings or practice time. * – Most laps led.)

Grand National Series

Winston Cup Series

Daytona 500

ARCA Permatex SuperCar Series
(key) (Bold – Pole position awarded by qualifying time. Italics – Pole position earned by points standings or practice time. * – Most laps led.)

References

External links
Blackie Wangerin results at Racing-Reference.info

1935 births
American Speed Association drivers
Living people
NASCAR drivers
People from Bloomington, Minnesota
Racing drivers from Minnesota